The Las Vegas Wranglers were a minor league baseball team that played in various leagues in the 1940s and 1950s. They were Las Vegas's first professional team in any sport.

The first year
The Wranglers were one of the charter franchises of the Class C Sunset League in 1947. Despite Paul Zaby's league-leading .402 batting average and a historic offensive season from Calvin Felix, the Wranglers (a Boston Braves affiliate) finished just 73-67, third place, and were beaten in the semifinals by Riverside, California. Las Vegas was managed by ex-major leaguer Newt Kimball, who also won 14 games as a pitcher for the Wranglers that year.

The 21-year-old Felix led the Sunset League in nearly every offensive category in 1947, including 52 home runs, the second-most ever hit in a pro league by such a young player (Tony Lazzeri, also then 21, hit 60 HR for Salt Lake City in 1925, but his team played 200 games). Felix was sold to the Class AAA Hollywood Stars of the Pacific Coast League after the season, but never played for them; instead he wound up with the unaffiliated Denver Bears of the Western League in 1948, and with Santa Barbara (a Dodgers affiliate) in 1949. By 1953, Felix was with the AAA Montreal Royals, but was sent down to the Texas League in '54; he never played in the majors.  

Actor Cameron Mitchell pitched one game for the '47 Wranglers; Las Vegas, needing all the pitching help they could get in the offense-minded Sunset League, signed Mitchell after he shut out the Los Angeles Angels (PCL) for four innings in an exhibition game. But the actor was shelled, allowing eleven runs in less than an inning to the Ontario, California Orioles.

Later years
Las Vegas continued to be one of the circuit's top teams the next three years. In 1948, the Wranglers moved up to second place and made to the championship series before losing to Reno. However, the team drew only around 600 fans per game (Las Vegas' population was only around 20,000 then) and faced a $15,000 deficit at season's end, partially because they were no longer affiliated with the Braves. In 1949, however, the Wranglers blew the league away with an 88-38 record and easily claimed the pennant, with attendance climbing to over 1,000 per contest. Due to budget cuts, there were no playoffs that year, and the '49 Wranglers had claimed Las Vegas' first pro sports championship (and last one for 37 years, until the Las Vegas Stars won the PCL crown in 1986). After a third-place finish in 1950, the top teams in the Sunset League merged with the Arizona–Mexico League to form the new Southwest International League in 1951.

Declining attendance vexed minor-league ball throughout the country in the early 1950s, and Las Vegas was no exception: despite two more winning seasons in 1951–52, the Wranglers (along with the rest of the SWIL) died after the 1952 season.

Baseball returned to Las Vegas in 1957, but the new team (also called the Wranglers) finished fourth in the Arizona–Mexico League, then folded. On May 26, 1958, however, the San Jose Pirates of the California League shifted operations to Las Vegas, renaming themselves (once again) the Wranglers. But the team finished a poor seventh and disbanded after the season when the Cal League contracted from eight teams to six.

Las Vegas would not have another professional baseball team for a quarter-century, until the Las Vegas Stars joined the Pacific Coast League in 1983.

Notable alumni
 Ron Brand (1958)
 Tom Butters (1958)
 Jim Campbell (1958)
 Larry Foss (1958)
 Bob Lee (1958) MLB AS
 Elmo Plaskett (1958)
 Bob Veale (1958) 2 x MLB AS; 1964 NL Strikeout Leader
 Bill Koski (1957)
 Frank Gabler (1951)
 Ed Wheeler (1950)
 Newt Kimball (1947, 1951 MGR)
 Cameron Mitchell (1947) Actor, pitched 1 game.

Year-by-year record

References

Defunct minor league baseball teams
Defunct California League teams
Professional baseball teams in Nevada
Sports teams in Las Vegas
Baseball teams established in 1947
Baseball teams disestablished in 1958
1947 establishments in Nevada
1958 disestablishments in Nevada
Boston Braves minor league affiliates
Defunct baseball teams in Nevada